is a town located in Nakagami District, Okinawa Prefecture, Japan. In the Okinawan language, nishi means "north" (in standard Japanese, however, it means "west"), as Nishihara was north of the historical Ryukyuan capital of Shuri.

As of October 2016, the town had an estimated population of 34,463 and a density of 2,200 persons per km².

Because both the University of the Ryukyus and the Okinawa Christian Junior College are located in Nishihara, and the Okinawa International University is located nearby, Nishihara's municipal slogan is "Education Town".

Geography

The north, west, and south of Nishihara are hilly; these areas give way to the low-lying coast in the east of the town.

The highest point in Nishihara is Untamamo. The low-lying peak, also known as Untamamui in the Okinawan language, sits to the south of the town on the border of Nishihara and the neighboring town of Urasoe. Due to its pyramidal shape, the peak is sometimes known as the "Nishihara Fuji" for its resemblance to Mount Fuji. Untamamo has utaki, or places sacred to the Okinawan religion, on both the north and south sides of the peak. Untamamo was the site of fierce fighting during the Battle of Okinawa in World War II; the spontaneous combustion of unexploded ordnance caused numerous mountain fires in the post-war period.

Neighboring municipalities
Naha
Urasoe
Ginowan
Haebaru
Yonabaru
Nakagusuku

History

Nishihara was part of the Nishibaru magiri, one of the magiri, or administrative units created prior to the establishment of the Ryukyu Kingdom. The magiri was administered from the former village of Kōchi; in a later period the administrative center was located in the former village of Unaga.

Nishihara flourished as a center of sugar manufacturing at the beginning of the 20th century. The Japanese government promoted the construction of sugar refineries in the village. In 1944 the Imperial Japanese Army built a military airstrip in the Onaha district of Nishihara; the area was bombed by the United States on October 10 of the same year, causing extensive damage to Onaha. It was near the village of Nishihara that the U.S. 1st Marine Division reached its initial invasion objective on April 4, 1945 during the Battle of Okinawa. The entirety of Nishihara was destroyed as a front line in the battle, and its residents fled to the north and south of Okinawa Island. However, 47% of the population of Nishihara was ultimately killed during World War II.

The Gaja district of Nishihara was the center of initial post-war reconstruction. Rice was planted immediately after the war, but this was soon replaced by the sugarcane cultivation of the prewar period. Nishihara saw the development of business enterprises and residential land development in the mid-1960s; by 1979 the population of Nishihara had increased to the point that the village was elevated to town status. The urbanization of the town continues due to the presence of university facilities and residential developments.

Education

Municipal schools:
 Nishihara Junior High School (西原中学校)
 Nishihara Higashi Junior High School (西原東中学校)
 Nishihara Elementary School (西原小学校)
 Nishihara Higashi Elementary School (西原東小学校)
 Nishihara Minami Elementary School (西原南小学校)
 Sakata Elementary School (坂田小学校)

There is also a nationally-controlled elementary school, Elementary School Attached to the College of Education, University of the Ryukyus (琉球大学教育学部附属小学校).

Notable people from Nishihara
Hohan Sōken, Okinawan martial arts
Koichi Taira, politician

See also
2008 Nishihara mayoral election

References

External links

Official website 

Towns in Okinawa Prefecture